American Latin pop duo Ha*Ash has recorded material for seven albums, consisting of 116 songs (96 as a lead artist and 20 as a featured artist). The duet was formed by sisters Ashley Grace and Hanna Nicole. This list includes songs from studio albums, extended play and singles, along with covers, and guest features. This list does not contain live versions or remixes released by the band.

They signed to Sony Music Latin in April 2002, and they recorded their self-titled debut album Ha*Ash in 2003. Many of the songs were written and produced by Áureo Baqueiro. After this, they appeared on Magos y Gigantes Soundtrack contributing to "Un Amigo Así. This was followed by their second album Mundos Opuestos in 2005, was also produced by Áureo Baqueiro. In early 2008, Ha*Ash released the third album, Habitación Doble, featuring a track with the singer Brandi Carlile on the song "Already Home", their first song officially recorded in English. In late 2008, Ha*Ash contributed one song "Cree y Atrévete" to Tinker Bell soundtrack.

On August 19, 2010, they participated in the album tribute for Mecano entitled, Tributo a Ana, José y Nacho, recording a new version of "Mujer Contra Mujer". In 2010, they released the song "Latente" about their experiences in the visit they made to Haiti in August of that year, after the earthquake that hit that country. A Tiempo is the fourth studio album released under the Sony Music Latin label on May 16, 2011. Ha*Ash worked with producer Áureo Baqueiro and Michele Canova. The same year, they participated in the album tribute for Hombres G entitled, En La Playa, recording a new version of "Temblando" with David Summers.

Ha*Ash released their first live album Primera Fila: Hecho Realidad in 2014. The album includes material from her past four studio albums as well as 8 newly recorded songs. Collaborations on the record include "Sé Que Te Vas" featuring Matisse, "No Te Quiero Nada" with Axel, "Quédate Lejos" with Maluma and "Qué Mas Da" with Julio Ramírez and Joy Huerta. The duo's fifth studio album, 30 de Febrero, was released on December 1, 2017. The alum features artists with Prince Royce and Abraham Mateo on the title track. This was followed by their second live album, entitled Ha*Ash: En Vivo, based on a recording from the concert at the Auditorio Nacional in Mexico on November 11, 2018.

Songs

Unreleased songs

Songwriting credits

See also
Ha*Ash discography

References

Notes
Notes for songs

Notes for band members

Citations

 
Ha Ash
Ha Ash